David Alba Fernández (born 5 May 1999) is a Spanish footballer who plays for CD Leganés B as either a central defender or a midfielder.

Club career
Born in Seseña, Toledo, Castile-La Mancha, Alba represented CD Seseña, Atlético Madrid and Getafe CF as a youth. On 6 May 2018, before even appearing with the reserves, he made his professional debut by starting in a 1–0 La Liga away defeat of UD Las Palmas.

On 26 July 2021, Alba moved to another reserve team, CD Leganés B in Segunda División RFEF.

References

External links
Getafe profile 

1999 births
Living people
Sportspeople from the Province of Toledo
Spanish footballers
Footballers from Castilla–La Mancha
Association football defenders
Association football midfielders
La Liga players
Segunda División B players
Tercera División players
Getafe CF footballers
Getafe CF B players
CD Leganés B players